Mycobacterium neoaurum is a rapid growing Mycobacterium, it can found in soil and as well as known to be isolated from patient isolates.

References

External links
Type strain of Mycobacterium neoaurum at BacDive -  the Bacterial Diversity Metadatabase

Acid-fast bacilli
neoaurum